Gregorio Bare (born 19 March 1973) is a Uruguayan cyclist. He competed at the 1996 Summer Olympics and the 2000 Summer Olympics.

References

External links
 

1973 births
Living people
Uruguayan male cyclists
Olympic cyclists of Uruguay
Cyclists at the 1996 Summer Olympics
Cyclists at the 2000 Summer Olympics
People from Colonia del Sacramento